Sandnes Church may refer to:

Sandnes Church (Agder), a church in Bygland municipality in Agder county, Norway
Sandnes Church (Rogaland), a church in the city of Sandnes in Rogaland county, Norway
Sandnes Church (Vestland), a church in Masfjorden municipality in Vestland county, Norway